Rally Australia is an automobile rally event which was held in Coffs Harbour as the final leg of the World Rally Championship (WRC) until 2018.

First run in 1988, the rally was held in and around Perth, Western Australia until 2006. It was part of the Asia-Pacific Rally Championship in 1988 and the WRC from 1989 to 2006. The rally returned in 2009 to the Northern Rivers region of New South Wales in early September and alternated with Rally New Zealand for 2010 and 2012 before becoming an annual fixture again in its own right from 2013. From 2011 the event was relocated to Coffs Harbour. , the Rally Australia event did not have a contract with WRC to be part of the World Championship beyond 2019.

The event has also been a round of the Australian Rally Championship although not consistently as the ARC technical regulations has been incompatible with the WRC in some years. Similarly the Western Australian Rally Championship has also been a part of Rally Australia during its Perth-based history.

During the years when Rally New Zealand replaced Rally Australia on the WRC calendar, the rally was run as an Australian Rally Championship round, titled Coffs Coast Rally.

History
The FIA World Rally Championship first came to Australia hosted in the state capital of Perth, Western Australia. Initially a super-special stage was run at Richmond Raceway near Fremantle with the service park at Langley Park on the Swan River. Competitors pushed as hard as they could on the world-famous jumps in the Bannister Forest, the super-special stage Langley Park and later the Gloucester Park Super Special stage.

It was praised for its unique road surface, consisting of tiny, smooth round stones that had the effect of driving on ball bearings. Rally Australia was voted "Rally of the Year" in 1995, 1999 and 2000 by the WRC teams.

The 2006 rally held on 26 to 29 October was the final one staged in Western Australia. It was cancelled by the holders of the rally contract, the Western Australia Tourism Commission after the then ruling Australian Labor Party decided to withdraw funding, despite widespread support for the rally, the largest annual international event held in Perth, to continue.

After missing a year from the 2007 WRC calendar, Rally Australia was to have a new home from 2008, based on the Gold Coast, Queensland on the east coast of Australia. However without planning approval from the Queensland state government to construct the proposed I-METT facility to headquarter the rally, the event was on hiatus.

Rally Australia's return was announced for September 2009, with the event to be based out of Kingscliff in northern New South Wales. The event will alternate year to year with the Rally New Zealand for a place on the World Rally Championship. The NSW state government designated the rally a major event, citing the huge impact of the event upon the economy of the region. The location for the event, planned to run there every second year until roughly 2020, was agreed upon between Rally Australia directors, local mayors and representatives from Events NSW, a state government tourism body.

The 2019 event was cancelled due to bushfires.

Controversy
The WRC rally in New South Wales was enabled by a special Act of New South Wales Parliament, the Motor Sports (WRC) Act 2009. This legislation is designed to last for the life of Rally Australia's ten to twenty-year contract with the NSW government. The event was still bound to abide by all environmental, cultural and heritage protection acts and was not exempt for any possible breaches that may or may not occur. The legislation allowed for a fast-tracked approval process after being stalled by local government.

Many residents objected to the legislation and also felt that the event was incompatible with the Northern Rivers' social fabric and reputation as an ecotourism destination. As a result, the 2009 event was marked by significant public protests in the lead-up to and during the event. Two race stages were abandoned due to protest activities where rocks were allegedly laid on the road prior to the scout cars coming through the stage. A race stage marshall claimed protesters had thrown rocks at rally cars, resulting in worldwide media reports and an outcry against protesters. However, after lobbying by public residents' group No Rally Group, who cited concerns about the indiscriminate vilification of residents opposing the rally, police eventually stated that there was no evidence that rocks had been thrown.

In September 2010, as controversy over the event continued in local communities, the Australian motorsport administrative body, the Confederation of Australian Motor Sports (CAMS), which owns Rally Australia, announced that the rally would relocate to Coffs Harbour, where there is an established rally event, the Coffs Coast Rally.

Rally Australia Chairman Alan Evans stated that the event's departure from the Northern Rivers marks the first time a leg of the WRC has ever been relocated due to residents' concerns, despite the fact that there have been many such efforts by residents all over the world in areas where the event has been staged.

The 2011 Rally Australia event was run successfully at Coff Harbour under the stewardship of Ben Rainsford as Chairman and Michael Masi as Chief Executive.

Winners

Notes

 Due to the World Rally Championship round rotation, the 1994 rally counted only for the 2-litre World Cup.

Multiple winners

See also

Motorsport in Australia
List of Australian motor racing series

References

External links

Official website
Rally Australia at eWRC-results

 
Recurring sporting events established in 1988
Australia
1988 establishments in Australia